The  1958 Monaco Grand Prix was a Formula One motor race held on 18 May 1958 at Monaco. It was race 2 of 11 in the 1958 World Championship of Drivers and race 2 of 10 in the 1958 International Cup for Formula One Manufacturers. The race was the 16th Monaco Grand Prix and was held over 100 laps of the three kilometre circuit for a total race distance of 314 kilometres.

The race was won by French driver Maurice Trintignant in the second and final Grand Prix victory of his long career. The win was the second consecutive victory for the privateer Rob Walker Racing Team. Trintignant took the teams newly acquired Cooper T45 to a twenty-second victory over Italian driver Luigi Musso driving a Ferrari 246 F1 with Musso's British teammate Peter Collins (Ferrari 246 F1) was third.

Trintignant's win put the superiority of front-engined cars in doubt. Musso's second place put him into a four-point championship lead over Moss and Trintignant.

Race report 
Vanwall and BRM returned after their Argentine absence and so Stirling Moss, Jean Behra and Harry Schell all went back to their regular drives. In Moss's place at the Rob Walker Racing Team with the new 2000 cc engined Cooper T45 was French driver Maurice Trintignant. The race winning Cooper T43 could not even qualify for the small 16-car Monaco grid, Ron Flockhart was first reserve for the race.

Missing from the field was the previous year's winner and reigning World Champion, Juan Manuel Fangio who did not have a full-season drive. Fangio himself was in America, preparing for an ultimately disappointing Indianapolis 500 campaign with the Dayton-Walther team. Future Formula One impresario Bernie Ecclestone entered a Connaught B-Type in his first appearance but he failed to qualify, as did two substitute drivers. Also failing to make the grid were Maria Teresa de Filippis, the first female driver to enter a World Championship Grand Prix, and 58-year-old Louis Chiron in his final appearance at a Grand Prix. The Monaco local had won the Grand Prix 27 years earlier but Chiron and his Maserati 250F did not make it past qualifying.

Tony Brooks took pole position in his Vanwall VW 5 but Behra won the start. He led until his brakes failed in his BRM P25, and Mike Hawthorn swept by in the Ferrari 246 F1. Moss (Vanwall VW 5) had been duelling with him throughout the race until he retired on lap 38, and Hawthorn followed suit on lap 47 with a broken fuel pump. Graham Hill (Lotus 12) retired from fourth place in his first race on lap 69, after briefly leading. Vanwall pair Brooks and Stuart Lewis-Evans retired, leaving Trintignant to lead home the Ferraris by some 20 seconds giving Rob Walker his second race win of the year. Behind the Ferraris of Luigi Musso and Peter Collins was Jack Brabham in the factory Cooper T45, although three laps down and still looking a long way from becoming the next years champion. Schell in his BRM P25 was a further six laps behind Brabham picking up the final points after Wolfgang von Trips had an engine failure in the closing stages in his Ferrari 246 F1. The only other car still circulating was the second Lotus 12 of Cliff Allison, 13 laps behind Trintignant.

Trintignant's win disproved the belief that rear-engined Cooper victory achieved by Stirling Moss in Argentina was a one-off freak circumstance win,  and the smaller British cars would be treated more seriously, although ultimately a Cooper would not win again until 1959. The Rob Walker Racing Teams pair of early 1958 victories would remain the best ever performance by a privateer team until the rise of Tyrrell Racing in the late 1960s.

Classification

Qualifying

Race

Notes
 – 1 point for fastest lap

Championship standings after the race

Drivers' Championship standings

Constructors' Championship standings

 Note: Only the top five positions are included for both sets of standings.

References

Monaco Grand Prix
Monaco Grand Prix
Grand Prix
Monaco Grand Prix